The Central Junior Football League was a football league competition operated under the Scottish Junior Football Association between 1931 and 2002, with an expansion of its membership in 1968.

Covering the Greater Glasgow area and also including teams in Lanarkshire and Renfrewshire from the outset, the Central league was created following the Intermediate dispute raised in 1927 by many of the Junior teams in relation to compensation payments for their players moving to Scottish Football League clubs, which in that era was a very common route of progression into the top professional level (whereas towards the end of the 20th century the Senior clubs would typically develop young players within their own youth systems, with Junior squads usually consisting of players of various ages who had been deemed not quite good enough for the professional level, and moving up from Junior to Senior being more the exception than the norm as in the past). The dispute lasted four years, with none of the teams from the powerful Glasgow Junior Football League entering the Scottish Junior Cup and instead playing in separate competitions. In 1931 these teams returned to the SJFA and the Central league was created, although notes from its 1932 AGM stated that it was the 32nd such meeting, suggesting that internally it was considered a continuation of the pre-1927 GJL. The Scottish Intermediate Cup was retained but re-designated the West of Scotland Junior Cup which has survived to the present day.

The Central League continued to provide many finalists in the Scottish Junior Cup, although its membership was somewhat weakened in the 1960s when several teams who had been successful in the GJL era (primarily Parkhead, Strathclyde and Shawfield) folded, due in part to changes of the urban environment in which they had drawn their support, with traditional communities being rebuilt and many residents rehomed in new peripheral estates or new towns outside the city. Clydebank also left to become a senior club.

A reorganisation of the Junior level across Scotland in 1968 resulted in the Lanarkshire Junior Football League, which had existed since 1891 but had never been as successful as the Glasgow and Central leagues which instead drew the best Lanarkshire teams away into their setup, was fully integrated into the new Central 'region', one of six in the country. In that period, Cambuslang Rangers (coincidentally one of those members based in Lanarkshire but always affiliated with Glasgow leagues) were the strongest club, but their dominance faded after the mid-1970s.

From the 1968 merger until 1982, a three-division setup was in operation, organised on merit (i.e. a hierarchy with promotion and relegation between them, rather than three sections of equal prominence split geographically) but with an end-of-season playoff between the three divisional winners to determine the overall champion who claimed the Evening Times Trophy, resulting in six of those fourteen seasons being won by the 'B Division' winners, and one – 1979–80 – in which the 'C Division' winners, Blantyre Victoria, were declared champions, although the format of the Evening Times Trophy had been amended to the Cup Winners' Cup a year earlier. In the next two seasons, Pollok then Lesmahagow were both overall champions and Evening Times Trophy winners before the playoffs were discontinued and the 1982–83 'A Division' winners were automatically declared the champions. This system then remained in place until 2002, when the Central region (in which Pollok had become the dominant force) was merged with the Ayrshire Junior Football League that had become increasingly strong in the 1990s in terms of supplying Scottish Junior Cup finalists, to form the Scottish Junior Football Association, West Region, one of three large regions. At the end of the 2019–20 season – which was curtailed due to the coronavirus pandemic – all 63 West Region clubs left the SJFA setup to join a new West of Scotland Football League in the Senior pyramid, bringing 125 years of Junior league football in the region (including the intermediate years) to an end.

Champions

1931–1968 era
Key:

1968–2002 era

Key:

Notes

List of winners

Notes

References

 Scottish Junior FA Structure, Scottish Junior Football Association
Non-League Scotland (archive version), with club progression by season 1990 to 2007)

1931 establishments in Scotland
2002 disestablishments in Scotland
Sports leagues established in 1931
Sports leagues disestablished in 2002
Defunct Scottish Junior Football Association leagues
Football in Glasgow
Scottish Junior Football Association, West Region
Football in Renfrewshire
Football in West Dunbartonshire
Football in East Dunbartonshire
Football in Inverclyde
Football in North Lanarkshire
Football in South Lanarkshire
Football in East Renfrewshire